Pempelia is a genus of moths of the family Pyralidae described by Jacob Hübner in 1825.

Species
Pempelia albariella Zeller, 1839
Pempelia albicostella Amsel, 1958
Pempelia albifasciella (Hartig, 1937)
Pempelia alpigenella Duponchel, 1836
Pempelia ambustiella Ragonot, 1887
Pempelia amitella Zerny, 1934
Pempelia amoenella (Zeller, 1848)
Pempelia apicella (de Joannis, 1927)
Pempelia bitinctella (Wileman, 1911)
Pempelia brephiella (Staudinger, 1879)
Pempelia campicolella Erschoff, 1874
Pempelia catonella (Caradja, 1925)
Pempelia cirtensis (Ragonot, 1890)
Pempelia corticinella (Ragonot, 1887)
Pempelia dubiella Duponchel, 1836
Pempelia erastriella (Ragonot, 1887)
Pempelia eucometis (Meyrick, 1882)
Pempelia fibrivora Meyrick, 1934
Pempelia funebrella (Ragonot, 1893)
Pempelia genistella Duponchel, [1837]
Pempelia intricatella (Ragonot, 1887)
Pempelia heringii (Ragonot in de Joannis & Ragonot, 1889)
Pempelia johannella Caradja, 1916
Pempelia livorella Erschoff, 1874
Pempelia lundbladi Rebel, 1940
Pempelia maculata (Staudinger, 1876)
Pempelia malgassicella (Paulian & Viette, 1955)
Pempelia mesozonella (Bradley, 1966)
Pempelia nigricans (Hulst, 1900)
Pempelia nigrisquamella (Ragonot, 1887)
Pempelia niveicinctella (Ragonot, 1887)
Pempelia nobilella (Ragonot, 1887)
Pempelia numidella Ragonot, 1890
Pempelia obliteratella Erschoff, 1874
Pempelia palumbella (Denis & Schiffermüller, 1775)
Pempelia psammenitella Zeller, 1867
Pempelia romanoffella (Ragonot, 1887)
Pempelia sablonella (Rothschild, 1915)
Pempelia semistrigella (Mabille, 1908)
Pempelia sinensis (Caradja, 1938)
Pempelia strophocomma (de Joannis, 1932)

References

Phycitini
Pyralidae genera